Star Wars: SC 38 – Reimagined is a 2019 fan remake of the 38th scene in Star Wars (1977), in which the characters of Obi-Wan "Ben" Kenobi and Darth Vader engage in a lightsaber duel on the first Death Star. It was directed by Philip Silvera, and stars stuntpeople, Dan Brown and Richard Cetrone, performing in the new footage as Kenobi and Vader respectively. It was uploaded by FXitinPost to YouTube on May 8, 2019.

Summary
FXitinPost filmed and produced new sequences with VFX, deepfaking, and more elaborate fighting choreography. It intercuts with footage from the original Star Wars scene, and audio (dialogue and music) from Star Wars: Episode III – Revenge of the Sith.

Cast
 Dan Brown as Obi-Wan "Ben" Kenobi
 Richard Cetrone as Darth Vader

The remake uses archival audio and footage from Star Wars (1977) and Star Wars: Episode III – Revenge of the Sith (2005), which includes Alec Guinness and Ewan McGregor as Obi-Wan, James Earl Jones and Hayden Christensen as Vader/Anakin Skywalker, Mark Hamill as Luke Skywalker, Harrison Ford as Han Solo, Carrie Fisher as Leia Organa, Peter Mayhew as Chewbacca, Anthony Daniels as C-3PO, and Kenny Baker as R2-D2.

Production

In an email to Fast Company, FXitinPost's Christopher Clements explained that the team drew inspiration from the hallway scene of Rogue One: A Star Wars Story (2016), where Darth Vader kills some of the Rebel troops with his lightsaber.

It took two and a half years for the remake to be completed. Most of the time was spent on the postproduction and VFX.

Reception

Critics
Star Wars: SC 38 – Reimagined received positive reviews from critics, most of whom lauded the special effects and fighting choreography, and felt that it updated and improved upon the original scene. Regarding the visual effects, comparisons have also been drawn with the Star Wars Prequel trilogy, and its third episode, Revenge of the Sith, containing the battle between Obi-Wan and Anakin Skywalker on the planet of Mustafar.

Despite praising the project, Darren Orf of Popular Mechanics was displeased and claimed that it encapsulates "what Star Wars films have lost," referring to the negative reception regarding George Lucas' alterations of the Original Star Wars trilogy, and the Star Wars Prequel trilogy "overusing" CGI.

Audiences
Kofi Outlaw of ComicBook.com noted that fans of Star Wars are divided about the project in that some praised the project for having a "the polish of a modern Star Wars film," and some criticized it, believing that it encapsulates "everything they believe to be wrong with this franchise," which also refers to Lucas' changes of the Original trilogy.

"Best of" lists
Star Wars: SC 38 - Reimagined has received spots on critics' best fan edits and films lists.

 2nd - James Richards, Dork Side of the Force
 3rd - Andres Diplotti, Cracked.com
 7th - Izak Bulten, Screen Rant

References

External links
 
 

Fan films based on Star Wars
2019 films
2010s English-language films
2010s American films